Sohrab Sepehri (October 7, 1928 – April 21, 1980) was a notable Iranian poet and painter. He is considered to be one of the five most famous Iranian poets who have practiced modern poetry alongside Nima Youshij, Ahmad Shamlou, Mehdi Akhavan-Sales, and Forough Farrokhzad. Sepehri's poems have been translated into several languages, including English, French, Spanish, Italian and Lithuanian.

Biography
Sohrab was born in Kashan, Iran on October 7, 1928. He grew up in a family that was into art and poetry. His father worked in a post office and loved art. His mother loved poetry and art, too. When he was a child, his father suffered from paralysis and died in 1941. Sohrab missed his only brother who was his only playmate in childhood, too. He completed his elementary and secondary education in Kashan and moved to Tehran in 1943 to study at a teachers' college. He worked as a teacher for a few years, then enrolled as a student in the Faculty of Fine Arts at the University of Tehran and graduated with honours. After finishing his education, he was employed in an oil company, which he left after 8 months. He soon published his first collection of poems named "The Death of Color", followed by a second collection, "Life Sleeps". Sohrab Sepehri was very talented in fine arts and his paintings were displayed in many European exhibits. His paintings are about nature; one of them was sold in Tehran in 2018. He is one of Iran's foremost modernist painters. Unfortunately, he moved to England for treatment but he had to return Tehran because of the progression of his illness. Finally, he died in Pars Hospital in Tehran on April 28, 1980. He was buried in Kashan. Sohrab never got married and his grave is frequently visited by many art lovers. 

Sepehri travelled to many European countries. In Paris, he enrolled in a lithography course at the school of Fine Arts. However, after he stopped receiving a scholarship, he needed to work and make a living. He sometimes worked hanging from tall buildings to wash the apartments' windows.

Poetry
Well-versed in Buddhism, mysticism, and Western traditions, he blended the Eastern concepts with Western techniques, thereby creating a kind of poetry unprecedented in the history of Persian literature. He had his own style of writing poetry, using short sentences rather than long ones, the latter having been frequently used in Persian poetry for centuries. To him, new forms were new means to express his thoughts and feelings. In one of his works called 'Footsteps of Water' or ‘The Water’s Footfall’, Sepehri introduces himself, his family, and his way of thinking in a poetic form. This poem which is written like a biography has two aspects: the inner and outer. The Inner aspect of this poem is about God's recognition through the beauty of nature. Sepehri beautifully explains that he doesn't blindly do his religious duties. In most of his poems, Sepehri introduces a new form of literature by using romanticism and symbolism. The beauty of his poems is seen through his avocation of nature and the use of tender and simple language. Abdolali Dastgheib, acclaimed literary critic and writer, believes that Sepehri reached great levels in poetic language following the publication of his later books such as ‘The Water’s Footfall’, ‘Traveller’ and ‘The Green Volume’. There are many examples of  personifications, or symbols in his poetry. In his poem "Let's not Spoil the Water", he talks about water, the necessary and basic element of life which people must keep clean. He used a special symbolism in these poems that makes the objects talk to the reader, rather than describing those objects. 

Sepehri's poetry is full of humanity and concern for human values. He also achieved a new technique in painting which is called Texture and was unknown to other painters for a long time. He used to create most of his pieces of art in isolated places like "Ghariyeh Chenar" and the deserts around Kashan. His poetry has been translated into many languages including English, French, Spanish, German, Italian, Swedish, Arabic, Turkish, Dutch and Russian. An English translation of his selected poems by Ali Salami was published in 2003.

Timeline
Born in 1928 – Kashan, Iran
He hosted a painting exhibition – Tehran, 1944
He published his first poetry book (The Death of Color) that followed by a few other books in the same year – 1951
He graduated from the fine arts university with Bachelor of Arts degree in painting from Honar-haye Ziba University, Tehran – 1953
He translated some Japanese poetry into Persian and published them in a literary magazine called Sokhan – 1955
He travelled to Ghazvin and attended the Paris Fine Arts School in lithography – 1957
He travelled to Tokyo to further his studies in lithography and wood carving – 1960
He published three books in poetry – 1960
On the way back to Iran from Japan, he visited India and became familiar with the ideology of Buddhism – 1961
He travelled to India again and visited several cities and provinces – 1964
He travelled to Pakistan and Afghanistan 1964
He travelled to Europe and visited several countries such as Germany, England, France, Spain, the Netherlands, Italy, and Austria – 1966
He published some long poems after he returned to Iran – 1966
He hosted a painting exhibition in Tehran – 1967
He published another book in poetry – 1967
He travelled to Greece and Egypt – 1974
He published his final, comprehensive book called Hasht Ketab, which was the collection of almost all of his published poems in one volume – 1976
He got Leukemia and travelled to England for treatment – 1978
Unfortunately, his attempt to defeat cancer brought him no result. He returned to Iran and died in Pars Hospital in Tehran on Monday April 21, 1980. Buried in Mashhad Ardehal, Kashan, Isfahan province, Iran.

Works
Hasht Ketab (Eight Books) 1976
The Death of Color 1951
The Life of Dreams 1953
Us nil, us a look Was not published until 1977
Downpour of Sunshine 1958
East of Sorrow 1961
The Wayfarer 1966
The Green Space 1967 (A poem from this book: The Oasis of Now (1965) translated by Kazim Ali with Mohammad Jafar Mahallati, BOA Editions, 2013.)

See also
 Iranian art
 Islamic art
 Islamic calligraphy
 List of Iranian artists

References

Further readingThe Lover Is Always Alone''. Trans. Karim Emami. Tehran: Sokhan,
Sepehri, Sohrab, and Riccardo Zipoli. While poppies bloom: Poems and Panoramas. Trans. Karim Emami. Tehran: Zarrin-o-Simin Books, 2005.
Bidi, Hamed. "Where Are My Shoes?" While Poppies Bloom. 12 Oct 2006. 24 Oct 2000
Valiabdi, Mostafa. Hichestan.Tehran: Tiam, 2005.
Karimi-Hakkak, Ahmad. Hasht Ketab: Professor Hakkak's view on the Sepehri's esthetic vision and significance.United States: Ketabe Gooya, 2005.
Sepehri, Parvaneh. The Blue Room. Tehran: Gooya, 2003.
Sepehri, Paridokht. Wherever I am, let me be! Tehran: Peykan, 2005.
Sayar, Pirouz. Paintings and Drawings Of Sohrab Sepehri. Tehran: Soroush Press, 2002.
Sepehri, Paridokht. Sohrab, the Migratory Bird. Tehran: Tahouri, 1996.
Hamid Siahpoush. The Lonely Garden: Sohrab Sepehri's Remembrance. Tehran: Negah, 2003.
Abdolali Dastgheib. 2006. The Green Garden of Poetry, Critical Review of poems by Sohrab Sepehri. Amitis Publishers, Tehran, Iran. . (Title in Persian: باغ سبز شعر.)
Martin Turner (1988) The poetry of Sohrab Sepehri, Wasafiri, 4:9, 18–21, . Retrieved from: https://www.tandfonline.com/action/showCitFormats?doi=10.1080%2F02690058808574175

External links

 Sohrab Sepehri Official Website: Biography, Poems, Paintings and anythings about Sohrab Sepehri
 Sohrab Sepehri in Persian Language
 Sohrab-Sepehri: Containing Biography, selected works and much more
 A Tribute to Sohrab Sepehri
 About Sohrab Sepehri
 Sohrab Sepehri's Official Facebook Page
 
 

20th-century Iranian poets
20th-century Iranian painters
20th-century male writers
1928 births
1980 deaths
Iranian male poets
People from Kashan